Mérovée Ephrem (born 7 February 1990 in Carpentras) is a French former figure skater who skated internationally for Monaco. She is the first skater to represent Monaco in an ISU Championship, which she did for the first time at the 2007 European Figure Skating Championships. Before the 2006-2007 season, she competed in France and placed 8th as a junior at the French Figure Skating Championships.

Programs

Competitive highlights

References

External links
 
 Planete Patinage

French female single skaters
Monegasque figure skaters
Monegasque sportswomen
1990 births
Living people
People from Carpentras
Sportspeople from Vaucluse